Patna Se Pakistan is a 2015 Indian Bhojpuri-language action film written and directed by Santosh Mishra and produced by Ananjay Raghuraj. The film was released on 23 January 2015 in Bihar and on 6 March 2015 in the rest of India. 
The production companies involved are Ananya Craft and Visions and Trimurti Entertainment Media. The film stars Dinesh Lal Yadav, Amrapali Dubey and Kajal Raghwani. Sushil Singh, Ashok Samarth and Brijesh Tripathi are in supporting roles.

Plot
Kabir (Dinesh Lal Yadav "Nirhua") is a simple living man who loses his entire family in a terrorist attack. Kabir pleads with the government to find the culprit, but when the govt refuses to help Kabir takes the matter into his own hands. He goes to Pakistan from Patna and fights with the terrorist organisation.

Cast

 Dinesh Lal Yadav Nirahua As Kabir
 Amrapali Dubey As Shahnaz
 Kajal Raghwani As Komal 
 Sushil Singh As Soyab
 Ashok Samarth As Daud Hasan
 Aaditya Jaiswal as Hussain
 Manoj Tiger As Minister
 Sambhavna Seth as an item number

Soundtrack
The Music of Patna Se Pakistan was composed by Rajesh-Rajnish with lyrics penned by Pyare Lal Yadav. The soundtrack included an unusually large number of songs at 12. It was produced under "Worldwide Records" label.

References

2015 films
2015 action films
Indian action films
Films set in Patna
2010s Bhojpuri-language films